is an archaeological site in Mersin Province, Turkey.

Geography
The site is situated in the rural area of Erdemli district of Mersin Province. Visitors from Mersin follow Turkish state road  and a village road from the town of Ayaş to north. The ruins are to the west of the road.

History
Due to scarcity of documents, the history of the site has not been studied and the original name of the site is unknown. The Turkish name  means "roof-ruin". But the presence of a Hellenistic temple and polygonal masonry imply that the site was originally a Hellenistic site. It may be a 1st or 2nd century BC temple. The church however is probably a 6th-century Byzantine building. It seems, like many other similar sites the settlement continued uninterrupted from the Hellenistic to Byzantine age.

The ruins
Although the ruins are scattered around, only three building are partially standing. The building just next to the road is thought to be an early Byzantine church. Two walls as well as the apse are standing. The Hellenistic temple is further to west and located on a hill. It is a temple of Hermes, the Greek god of transitions. Partially rock carved, four walls and a staircase are standing. On the wall there is a relief of Caduceus. There is another building which was probably a tower to the south of the temple. There are also ruins of cisterns, sepulchers etc. around.

References

Greek temples
Erdemli District
Archaeological sites in Mersin Province, Turkey
Temples of Hermes
Hellenistic Anatolia
History of Mersin Province
Olba territorium